Gordon is a former community in Sherman County, Oregon, United States. It was first settled in 1875 by Tom Gordon, an Irish immigrant, and formally established with a post office in 1896, which only operated from July to December that year before closing. Gordon is contemporarily considered a ghost town.

References

1896 establishments in Oregon
Populated places established in 1896
Former populated places in Sherman County, Oregon
Ghost towns in Oregon
Unincorporated communities in Sherman County, Oregon